Karmravank (meaning Red Monastery) is an abandoned 10th century Armenian monastery in the Vaspurakan province of historic Armenia (now in the Van Province of Turkey).  It was founded by King Gagik I (908-943) of the Artsruni dynasty.  It is located 12 kilometers west-northwest of Akhtamar Island.

Gallery

See also 
 Narekavank, a nearby 10th century Armenian monastery also founded by King Gagik
 Akhtamar Island, a nearby island on Lake Van with the 10th century Armenian Church of the Holy Cross

References

External links 

 Recent pictures

Armenian culture
Armenian Apostolic Church
Armenian Apostolic churches
Armenian Apostolic monasteries
Armenian churches in Turkey
Kingdom of Vaspurakan
10th-century churches
Armenian buildings in Turkey